Steakhouse is a 2021 Slovenian animated short film directed by Špela Čadež. The short has been presented and won awards in a number of festivals, such as a Jury Mention at the Clermont-Ferrand Film Festival and the Short Film Jury Award at the Annecy International Animation Film Festival qualifying the short for the 95th Academy Awards and got nominated for an Annie Award in Best Short Subject category in 2022.

Plot 
The short film invades the privacy of a couple as it takes place in closed apartment.

Reception 
Since its launch, the film has been selected in various festivals and academies around the world:

References

External links
 
 Steakhouse on Annecy International Animated Film Festival
 Steakhouse on Unifrance
 Steakhouse on EuropeanFilmAwards

2021 films
French animated short films
2021 animated films
2021 short films
Slovenian animated films
German animated short films